The 2001 Copa Libertadores de América was the 42nd edition of CONMEBOL's premier club football tournament. The winners were Boca Juniors, beating Mexican club Cruz Azul in the finals on penalties and lifting its fourth Copa Libertadores trophy.

First round
The first round of the Copa Libertadores drew 32 teams into eight groups of four; two of these teams came from a preliminary round involving two Mexican clubs and two Venezuelan clubs. In each group, teams played against each other home-and-away. Teams receive 3 points for a win, 1 point for a draw, and no points for a loss. If two or more teams are equal on points, the following criteria will be applied to determine the ranking:
superior goal difference;
higher number of goals scored;
higher number of away goals scored;
draw.
The top two in each group advanced to the second round.

Group 1

Group 2

Group 3

Group 4

Group 5

Group 6

Group 7

Group 8

Knockout phase
In the knockout phase, teams played against each other over two legs on a home-and-away basis. If teams are tied on points and goals after both legs (180 minutes of play), a penalty shootout is carried out.

Bracket

Round of 16

Quarter-finals

Semi-finals

Finals

References

External links 

 2001 Copa Libertadores at RSSSF

CONMEBOL: Copa Toyota Libertadores 2001

1
Copa Libertadores seasons